The Faithful Son is a 2017 Belgian drama film directed by Guérin Van de Vorst in his directorial debut. It is based on the short film of the same name by Van de Vorst, who wrote the screenplay with Matthieu Reynaert. The film had its world premiere at the Festival International du Film Francophone de Namur on 5 October 2017. It received three nominations at the 9th Magritte Awards, including Best First Feature Film.

Cast
 Vincent Rottiers as Ben
 Sébastien Houbani as Anouar
 Johan Libéreau as Jo
 Salomé Richard as Lucie
 Walid Afkir as Mustapha
 Simon Caudry as Sam

Accolades

References

External links
 

2017 films
2017 drama films
Belgian drama films
French drama films
2010s French-language films
2010s French films